Ewald J. Schmeichel was a member of the Wisconsin State Assembly.

Biography
Schmeichel was born on December 22, 1889, in Two Rivers, Wisconsin. He studied in the University of Wisconsin-Oshkosh, University of Wisconsin-Stout and University of Wisconsin-Madison. Schmeichel died in 1975.

Career
Schmeichel was a member of the Assembly from 1957 to 1960. He was a Republican.

References

People from Two Rivers, Wisconsin
University of Wisconsin–Oshkosh alumni
University of Wisconsin–Stout alumni
University of Wisconsin–Madison alumni
1889 births
1975 deaths
20th-century American politicians
Republican Party members of the Wisconsin State Assembly